Rykolanka (in its upper course: Dylówka) is a river of Poland, a left tributary of the Pilica near Przybyszew.

Rivers of Poland
Rivers of Masovian Voivodeship